Carsium was a fortress built in the Roman province of Moesia in the 1st century CE.

Gallery

See also
List of castra

Notes

External links

Virtual reconstruction of the fortress
Roman castra from Romania - Google Maps / Earth

Roman legionary fortresses in Romania
Roman fortifications in Moesia Inferior
History of Dobruja
Historic monuments in Constanța County